Pornpreecha Jarunai (born 27 December 1985) is a Thai professional footballer who plays as an attacking midfielder for Thai League 2 club Trat.

References

External links

1985 births
Living people
Pornpreecha Jarunai
Pornpreecha Jarunai
Association football midfielders
Pornpreecha Jarunai
Pornpreecha Jarunai